"Pray" is a song by English boy band Take That. Written by band member Gary Barlow, the ballad was released on 5 July 1993 as the second single from their second studio album, Everything Changes (1993). It is the first of twelve singles by the band to reach number one on the UK Singles Chart, staying at number one for four weeks, and starting a streak of four consecutive number-one singles. The song has received a Gold sales status certification and sold over 438,000 copies in the UK, won British Single of the Year and British Video of the Year at the 1994 Brit Awards, and was the finale of Take That's Beautiful World Tour 2007.

A newly arranged and recorded version was released on 21 September 2018 as the first single of their greatest hits album Odyssey. The album was released on 23 November 2018 followed by a Greatest Hits tour marking the band's 30th anniversary in 2019.

Critical reception
AllMusic editor Peter Fawthrop described "Pray" as a "quality ballad" in his review of Everything Changes. Tom Ewing of Freaky Trigger complimented Barlow's songwriting on the song. He said that "at this point he was still the group's secret weapon – canny and professional enough to bring the hooks but with a streak of desperate earnestness. So the classic Take That song – "Pray" isn't their best, but it very much sets a template – wanders like a lost puppy on the verses then pulls itself together for a monster chorus." Caroline Sullivan from The Guardian viewed it as "rather fine". A reviewer from Music & Media commented, "The five messiahs have found a juvenile congregation in the UK willing to lend its ear. Now they're praying for continental attention for their matchless bubble gum soul."

Alan Jones from Music Week gave "Pray" three out of five. He felt that it is a "fairly intricate mid-tempo workout [that] has pleasant harmonies and a glossy sheen, although the song itself is more slight than some of the group's previous efforts – none of which really matters, as it's bound for the Top Five." In an retrospective review, Pop Rescue wrote that Barlow's "soft soulful vocals make light work of this whilst the rest of the group put in some great vocal harmonies. The song is light and summery, thanks to the 90’s rent-a-beat". Smash Hits gave "Pray" four out of five, praising the chorus as "a fab gospel tune with the group sharing vocals and doing those beautiful harmonies that they seem to be getting so good at these days." The magazine also declared it as "a pretty mature song" and "a definite number 1." A reviewer from Staffordshire Sentinel complimented it as a "soulful ballad".

Music video
The accompanying music video for the song was directed by Gregg Masuak and shot in Acapulco, Mexico. The clip features the band members in the exotic location singing and dancing. The band members are paired with a goddess of the four elements, taking on a different form with each – Air (Mark Owen), Fire (Jason Orange), Earth (Robbie Williams) and Water (Howard Donald) – with the exception of Gary Barlow who is represented in a neutral black and white context. In Barlow's autobiography, he stated that after the disappointment of where "I Found Heaven" was filmed, the band were a lot happier about the location for this video. Reflecting on the video in 2005 for Take That: For the Record, Donald remarked: "We was doing all the sexual thing and stuff. ... Even then it felt a little bit uncomfortable. But girls like it. Girls like this kind of thing."

Track listings

Original version

 UK CD1 and European CD single 
 "Pray" (radio edit)
 "Pray" (a cappella)
 "Pray" (alternative club mix)

 UK CD single 2 
 "Pray" (club swing mix)
 "It Only Takes a Minute" (Tommy Musto Underground dub)
 "Once You've Tasted Love" (Harding & Curnow remix)
 "It Only Takes a Minute" (Tommy Musto Underground vocal)

 UK 7-inch and cassette single 
 "Pray" (radio edit)
 "Pray" (a cappella)

 Australian limited-edition maxi-single 
 "Pray" (radio edit) – 3:43
 "Pray" (a cappella) – 4:26
 "Pray" (alternative club mix) – 5:21
 "Pray" (club swing mix)
 "It Only Takes a Minute" (Tommy Musto Underground dub)
 "Once You've Tasted Love" (Harding & Curnow remix)
 "It Only Takes a Minute" (Tommy Musto Underground vocal)

 Australian Tour Edition CD single 
 "Pray" (radio edit)
 "Relight My Fire" (live)
 "Could It Be Magic" (live)
 "It Only Takes a Minute" (live)

2018 version
 International digital single
 "Pray – Odyssey version" (new arrangement and vocals) – 3:40

Personnel
 Gary Barlow – lead vocals
 Howard Donald – backing vocals
 Jason Orange – backing vocals
 Mark Owen – backing vocals
 Robbie Williams – backing vocals

Charts

Weekly charts

Year-end charts

Certifications

|}

References

1990s ballads
1993 singles
1993 songs
Bertelsmann Music Group singles
Brit Award for British Single
Polydor Records singles
RCA Records singles
Songs written by Gary Barlow
Take That songs
UK Singles Chart number-one singles